Gary England (born October 3, 1939) is the former chief meteorologist for KWTV (channel 9), the CBS-affiliated television station in Oklahoma City, Oklahoma. England was the first on-air meteorologist to alert his viewers of a possible tornado using a commercial Doppler weather radar. He is also known for contributing to the invention of the First Warning map graphic commonly used to show ongoing weather alerts without interrupting regular programming. Currently, Gary is the Vice President of Corporate Relations and Weather Development at Griffin Communications LLC, the parent company to KWTV-DT, although the company uses the same single-story building as the studio.

Early life and career
England was born in Seiling, Oklahoma to Hazel and Lesley England. He lived in Enid for a while but was mostly raised in the Seiling area. Like many meteorologists, a dramatic early experience with the weather shaped his interest. For England, one event stands out among the variety of memorable experience with western Oklahoma weather: the 1947 Glazier–Higgins–Woodward tornadoes which wiped out much of nearby Woodward, killing over 100 people. He counts other weather, including tornadoes, blizzards, dust storms, flash floods, and wildfires, as piquing his interest in weather.

After graduating from high school, England joined the U.S. Navy at age 17, where he first began to study weather seriously. He attended the University of Oklahoma and graduated in 1965 with a B.S. in mathematics and meteorology. England then spent four years as a consulting meteorologist and oceanographer with A.H. Glenn and Associates in New Orleans.

Broadcasting career
England's first broadcasting job was a short stint at KTOK, an Oklahoma City talk radio station. England began working at KWTV on October 16, 1972. A few months later, KWTV introduced the first radar system specifically designed for television and during a live cut-in by England on May 24, 1973 for a tornado warning in Canadian County. Channel 9 viewers saw the radar image of a damaging F4 tornado near Union City in Canadian County which resulted in extensive damage to that small town. The Union City tornado was also the first documented chase ever on a tornado. The National Severe Storms Laboratory (NSSL) out of Norman placed numerous storm chasers around it to capture the life cycle on film, which was also a first.

An original video of England's live cut-in of the Union City tornado in 1973 is often still used today in Channel 9's promos of England and its severe weather coverage.

England is recognized, along with the firm Enterprise Electronics Corporation, as initiating development of the first commercial Doppler weather radar. While the National Weather Service is the only one legally responsible for issuing warnings in the United States, England is credited with issuing the first televised Doppler weather radar bulletin for a tornado, in March 1982. There is a dispute by some sources, as there was an earlier radar bulletin issued by Gil Whitney of WHIO-TV in Dayton, Ohio during the April 3, 1974 Xenia Tornado. However, the radar used by WHIO during the Xenia Tornado was a conventional weather radar, not a Dopplerized radar.

In 1990 he helped create First Warning, a state map which appeared in the corner of the television screen, with counties colored in to indicate storm watches and warnings. In 1991 England also helped create Storm Tracker, a computer program that provided the audience with the time of arrival of severe weather. First Warning And Storm Tracker are used nationwide. He also helped create I-News, a computer program, since discontinued, that allowed PC users to receive both severe weather and breaking news alerts on their computer.

On July 23, 2013, KWTV announced that England would be leaving his position at KWTV to become Vice President for Corporate Relations and Weather Development for Griffin Communications, the parent company of KWTV-DT (both Griffin and KWTV are located in the same single-story building).  England was to be succeeded by David Payne, and England's final day as KWTV head meteorologist would be August 30, 2013, with his last forecast given on August 28.  England's retirement had been anticipated since Payne joined the station in January, although England had previously said he expected to leave in October 2014.

Other work
England had a cameo appearance (via KWTV's archives) during the opening scene and served as one of three 'weather announcers' in the 1996 movie Twister.  He also served as a consultant for the film.

After the May 3, 1999 tornado outbreak, he appeared in over fifty national and international weather specials. In 2007 England wrote and recorded part of the sound track for a weather oriented episode of the cable show Saving Grace.  England has written several books on Oklahoma weather, including his 1996 autobiography, Weathering The Storm, in which he cited Harry Volkman as an influence on his career. A new biography of England by Bob Burke was published in December 2006 titled, "Friday Night in the Big Town".

England rejects anthropogenic climate change and believes in cyclic change due to many factors. A KWTV promo was featured in a Daily Show piece regarding global warming on June 14, 2007. The piece starts with comments by global warming denier and Oklahoma Senator James Inhofe regarding The Weather Channel's chief meteorologist's statement that the American Meteorological Society (AMS) should not certify anyone who does not accept global warming. Inhofe argued that The Weather Channel needs global warming in order to scare viewers and boost ratings. The Daily Show followed up Inhofe's comments by playing the KWTV's "Calm During The Storm" promo where a family is running from a massive tornado, cowering in the basement, the family hears England's voice on the television and the mother says to her son (clutched in her hands) "OK baby, listen to Gary England, he's going to let us know" in which then host Jon Stewart mocks the scene with "Listen to Gary England— OR YOUR CHILDREN WILL DIE!"  The Daily Show connects England and Inhofe as both being from Oklahoma.

England is interviewed in an episode of Monster Quest entitled "Unidentified Flying Creatures" where he comments on tornado footage that captured a Rod flying through the sky. In the interview, he comments on the phenomena without going into any supposition regarding its cause.

England made a cameo appearance in the 2021 fantasy movie Iké Boys as a weatherman.

Pop culture
England is a pop culture icon in Oklahoma City and has a cult like following. He originated his own homespun phrase which became local folklore: "jump back, throw me down, Loretta...it's Friday night in the big town!" England is aptly described as having a "folksy and off-beat sense of humor and a persona that's pure country".

Publications

See also

1948 Tinker Air Force Base tornadoes

References

External links
 KWTV-DT – Gary England — Griffin Communications LLC
 
 
 The Weather God of Oklahoma City by Sam Anderson, The New York Times Magazine, August 9, 2013

1939 births
Living people
People from Seiling, Oklahoma
United States Navy sailors
University of Oklahoma alumni
American television meteorologists